Neosilurus ater, commonly known as black catfish, butter jew or narrowfront tandan is a species of catfish native to rivers and streams in northern Australia and New Guinea.

References

ater
Freshwater fish of New Guinea
Freshwater fish of Australia
Taxa named by Alberto Perugia
black catfish